Chalachitram National Film Festival (CNFF) is a festival conducted in Guwahati, Assam.  The festival director is Utpal Datta, a National Film Award winning film critic and film maker.

Society and purpose
The festival is organised by Chalachitram, a society founded in Guwahati in 2016 with the primary aim “of taking films closer to the people and of using film as a weapon to create awareness of Indian heritage.” Indrani Laskar and Prabal Khaund are the Vice Presidents. Bhagabat Pritam is the General Secretary. Amarjyoti Deka is the Executive Secretary. And Babita Sarma is the Treasurer.

CNFF 2017
The inaugural edition of the festival took place at Rabindra Bhawan, Textile Institute and the mass communication department of Cotton College in March 2017 under the name Guwahati Film Festival (GFF). The chairperson of the jury was Bijaya Jena. The others members were film maker Haobam Paban Kumar from Manipur and Dr Abhijit Bora, Professor of Tezpur University. Assam culture minister Naba Kumar Doley was the chief guest in the inaugural session and Chief Ministar Sarbananda Sonowal was the Chief Guest in the Award ceremony. Gracing the occasion, the chief minister of Assam, Sarbananda Sonowal stated that "cinema reflects the philosophy of life, reality and expectations of society, and plays an important role in transforming society". He also recalled the contributions of pioneers Rupkonwar Jyoti Prasad Agarwalla and Bhabendra Nath Saikia, and contemporaries such as Jahnu Baruah and Manju Bora in taking the cinema of Assamese forward. Senthil Rajan Director DFF,  Vijaya Jena, and Pritom Saikia, the Commissioner and Secretary of the Cultural Affairs Department of the government of Assam were some of the other dignitaries in attendance on the Award Ceremony.

CNFF 2018
The second edition, GFF-2018, had a jury comprising Ashim Sinha (Chairperson), Nilanjan Datta (FTII), and Tribeni Rai (SRFTI). The Chief Guest of the opening ceremony Dr Manmohan Vaidya speaks about the current status of Indian Film and he requests the upcoming film makers to enrich their films with Indian ethos.  Participating as the appointed speaker, Film Maker Dr Santwana Bardoloi stated that "India is not a land of diverse cultures but a unique culture with the capacity to nurture diversities." Naba Kumar Doley and actor-turned-MLA Angurlata Deka, Film maker Manju Bora graced the closing ceremony. A total of 75 films were screened at this 3-day event. A souvenir was released too.

CNFF 2019
The third edition, in 2019, was rechristened as Chalachitram National Film Festival, had the theme 'Our Heritage, Our Pride', and took place at Jyoti Chitraban Campus. It had a total prize money of 1.5 lacs. Rakesh Mittal (chairperson), Christopher Dalton, and Ujjwal Chatterjee were the members of the jury.

Awards at CNFF-2019
Best Film – Banwash by Nilesh Yashwant Ambedkar (cash prize of Rs. 1 lac)
Best Film from the North East – Jaapi by Kripa Kalita (cash prize of Rs. 50,000)
Jury Special Mention – Daai by Monuj Borkotoky
Certificate of Merit – Vande Mataram by Swapna Maini
Certificate of Merit – Xoponar Setu by Ankurjyoti Deka

CNFF-2020
The fourth edition of the festival was officially launched on October 13, 2019. CNFF 2020, which happened March 6–8, included a panel discussion as well as an award for the best debut film, by the Film Critics Circle of India. It had a total prize money of 1.8 lacs; and a 9-member /all-women jury.

Festival director - Utpal Datta
Artistic director - Christopher Dalton
Advisory board members - Shaji Karun, Rahul Rawail, and Jayaraaj
Jury members - Advaita Kala, Monita Borgohain, Shalini Shah, Ratnottama Sengupta, Oorvazi Irani, Deepa Gahlot, Sathya Saran, Judy Gladstone, and Daniela Rogobete.

References

External links

Chalachitram at FilmFreeway
CNFF awards on IMDb

Film festivals in India
Film festivals established in 2017
Short film festivals in India
Documentary film festivals in India